Rosa Roth is a German television series. It consisted of 31 television films between 1994 and 2013.

See also
List of German television series

External links
 

German crime television series
1990s German police procedural television series
2000s German police procedural television series
2010s German police procedural television series
2000s German television series
1994 German television series debuts
2013 German television series endings
Television shows set in Berlin
German-language television shows
ZDF original programming